The men's K-1 slalom canoeing competition at the 2014 Asian Games in Hanam was held from 1 to 2 October at the Misari Canoe/Kayak Center. The slalom event was on flat water and not an artificial canoe slalom course. The K-1 (kayak single) event is raced by one-man kayaks. Each NOC could enter two athletes but only one of them could advance to the semifinal.

Schedule
All times are Korea Standard Time (UTC+09:00)

Results 
Legend
 DNF — Did not finish

Heats

Repechage

Last 16

Quarterfinals

Race 1

Race 2

Race 3

Race 4

Summary

Semifinals

Race 1

Race 2

Finals

Bronze medal

Gold medal

References 

 Official website

External links 
 Asian Canoe Confederation

Canoeing at the 2014 Asian Games